Martin Abentung (born March 27, 1981) is an Austrian-born luger who competed from 1999 to 2010. He won a silver medal in the mixed team event at the 2008 FIL World Luge Championships in Oberhof, Germany. His best individual finish was tenth in the men's singles event at those same championships.

Abentung also won two medals in the mixed team event at the FIL European Luge Championships with a silver in 2008 and a bronze in 2004. His best individual finish was fifth in the men's singles event at Cesana in 2008.

References

 Austrian luge profile of Abentung 
 
 List of European luge champions 
 Official website 
 Schiegl/Schiegl erklären Rücktritt at the Fédération Internationale de Luge de Course (12 October 2010 article accessed 19 October 2010.)

External links
 

1981 births
Living people
Austrian male lugers